Hite Store, also known as Riverview, is a historic general store in Lowesville, Amherst County, Virginia.  It was built in 1869, and is a two-story, "L"-shaped brick building in the Greek Revival style.  It has a hipped roof and features a full-width porch.  Contributing outbuildings are three frame-constructed, gable-roofed and weatherboard-clad one-story buildings, and a gable-roofed log barn.

It was added to the National Register of Historic Places in 1997.

References

Buildings and structures in Amherst County, Virginia
Commercial buildings completed in 1869
Greek Revival architecture in Virginia
Commercial buildings on the National Register of Historic Places in Virginia
National Register of Historic Places in Amherst County, Virginia
1869 establishments in Virginia